Christian Werring Clem (born 6 January 1973) is a retired Norwegian football midfielder. His career was ended by an ankle injury when he was 22 years old. 

He was capped 8 times for Norway u-21, but was born in Denmark and never played in Norway.

References

1973 births
Living people
Footballers from Copenhagen
Norwegian footballers
Norwegian people of Danish descent
Lyngby Boldklub players
Boldklubben Frem players
Fremad Amager players
Brøndby IF players
Danish Superliga players
Association football midfielders
Norway under-21 international footballers